opened in Fukuoka, Japan, in 1990. The permanent exhibition, which tells the history of Fukuoka, is arranged in eleven sections, including those focussing upon the King of Na gold seal (National Treasure), the Kuroda clan, and the Hakata Gion Yamakasa.

See also
 Fukuoka Art Museum
 List of Cultural Properties of Japan - paintings (Fukuoka)

References

External links
  Fukuoka City Museum
 Fukuoka City Museum at Google Cultural Institute

Museums in Fukuoka Prefecture
Buildings and structures in Fukuoka
City museums in Japan
Museums established in 1990
1990 establishments in Japan